Orthetrum anceps or Orthetrum ramburii is a freshwater dragonfly species, which occurs throughout Europe, India, and northern Africa.

See also 
 Orthetrum

References 

Libellulidae
Insects described in 1845
Taxobox binomials not recognized by IUCN